Illya Viktorovych Khodulya (born 16 June 1989) is a Ukrainian professional footballer who plays as a centre-back for Ukrainian club Skoruk Tomakivka.

References

External links
 Profile at Roteiro.cz
 
 
 

1989 births
Living people
Footballers from Zaporizhzhia
Ukrainian footballers
Association football defenders
FC Zirka Kropyvnytskyi players
FC Metalurh-2 Zaporizhzhia players
FC Nistru Otaci players
FC Dnepr Mogilev players
FC Hirnyk-Sport Horishni Plavni players
FC Olimpik Donetsk players
FC Stal Kamianske players
FC Hirnyk Kryvyi Rih players
FC Inhulets Petrove players
FC Inhulets-2 Petrove players
SK Benešov players
FC Kremin Kremenchuk players
FC Polissya Zhytomyr players
FC Lokomotiv Yerevan players
FC Peremoha Dnipro players
FC Rubikon Kyiv players
FC Skoruk Tomakivka players
Ukrainian First League players
Ukrainian Second League players
Ukrainian Amateur Football Championship players
Armenian First League players
Moldovan Super Liga players
Bohemian Football League players
Ukrainian expatriate footballers
Expatriate footballers in Moldova
Expatriate footballers in Belarus
Expatriate footballers in the Czech Republic
Expatriate footballers in Armenia
Ukrainian expatriate sportspeople in Moldova
Ukrainian expatriate sportspeople in Belarus
Ukrainian expatriate sportspeople in the Czech Republic
Ukrainian expatriate sportspeople in Armenia